Alexander Sutcliffe (born 21 January 1999) is an English professional rugby league footballer who plays as a  and  forward for Castleford Tigers in the Super League.

He has previously played for the Leeds Rhinos, and spent time on loan from Leeds at Featherstone Rovers in the Betfred Championship.

Background
Sutcliffe was born in Wakefield, West Yorkshire, England. 

He is not related to former Rhinos teammate Liam Sutcliffe. He has an older brother and a younger sister.

Career

Leeds Rhinos
In 2017 he made his Super League début for Leeds against the Wigan Warriors.

He has spent time on loan at Featherstone Rovers in the 2019 Betfred Championship.

On 17 October 2020, he played in the 2020 Challenge Cup Final victory for Leeds over Salford at Wembley Stadium.

Featherstone Rovers (loan)
On 9 Aug 2021 it was reported that he had signed for Featherstone Rovers in the RFL Championship on loan for the remainder of the 2021 season

Castleford Tigers
On 21 Sep 2021 it was reported that he had signed for Castleford Tigers in the Super League

References

External links
Castleford Tigers profile
Leeds Rhinos profile
SL profile

1999 births
Living people
Castleford Tigers players
Coventry Bears players
English rugby league players
Featherstone Rovers players
Leeds Rhinos players
Rugby league centres
Rugby league players from Wakefield